Glabella xicoi is a species of sea snail, a marine gastropod mollusk in the family Marginellidae, the margin snails.

Description

Distribution
This marine species occurs off Ghana.

References

Endemic fauna of Ghana
Marginellidae
Gastropods described in 1999